Yabu Pushelberg is an international design studio with offices in Toronto and New York. Founded in 1980 by Canadian designers George Yabu and Glenn Pushelberg, the studio has evolved from a traditional interior design firm into creative directors of experience, authoring design through branding and positioning, interiors, products, lighting, textiles, and styling.   

Yabu Pushelberg has won numerous awards including AD 100 Hall of Fame, BoF 500, Design Studio of The Year Public Vote, and Elle Decor A-List Designers. In 2014, George Yabu and Glenn Pushelberg were inducted in The Order of Canada, the second highest honour for merit in the system of orders, decorations, and medals of Canada, after the Order of Merit.

Founding Partners, George Yabu and Glenn Pushelberg
George Yabu and Glenn Pushelberg provide the intellectual and creative foundation to Yabu Pushelberg. Both graduated from the School of Interior Design at Ryerson Polytechnical Institute in 1976. Years after graduating, they met on the street by chance and began talking about how neither wanted to work from their respective homes. The idea of sharing a studio together was mentioned and led to the pair joining forces to rent a space.

When sharing a studio they realized they were in sync both professionally and personally. Their shared design philosophy and aesthetics were cemented when completing a drawing together. When their work was brought together, it was unclear it was created by two people. In 1980, George and Glenn decided to establish an interior design business together, naming the studio after their last names, Yabu and Pushelberg and have been partners in work and in life since.

Today they have grown their practice to a 100+ team with studio’s based in Toronto and New York where they work in 19+ countries and produce award-winning experiences and products.

Studio

Toronto 
Yabu Pushelberg’s Toronto studio occupies a former food distribution center at 55 Booth Street in the east end of Toronto. The next door building, 59 Booth Street, previously housed the Avenue Road Showroom, a business partnership between George Yabu, Glenn Pushelberg, and Stephan Weishaupt. When Avenue Road relocated, Yabu Pushelberg acquired the property, joining the two buildings to create the existing 13,000 ft2 studio space. Yabu Pushelberg renovated the two properties as one open-concept studio space which now features a reception area, gallery, boardrooms, communal kitchen, accounting offices, sample library, staff lockers, washrooms, a massage room, and outdoor patio. The 59 Booth property became the studio’s 925 ft2 gallery space which displays permanent artworks from George Yabu and Glenn Pushelberg’s private art collection, including specially commissioned Yayoi Kusama pumpkin and works by Anish Kapoor, Wolfgang Tillmans, Yutaka Sone, General Idea, and Ooloosie Saila.

New York 
Yabu Pushelberg’s New York studio was established in 2001 and is home to the design house’s Brand Strategy, Lighting, Project Management, Sustainability, and Legal teams, as well as three Interior Design Teams. After a decade in Soho, the studio moved to a three-level heritage building on White Street in Tribeca. Yabu Pushelberg has renovated each level of their space which comprises the (66) gallery, studio reception, a library, specialty floor, interior design studio, meeting rooms. The studio also worked with collaborators Molteni&C to design a custom concrete kitchen to support informal meetings and socialization. Notable artworks on display in the NYC studio gallery include pieces by Marcel Dzama, Hiroshi Senju, Hiroshi Sigimuto, and Philip Lorca Dicorcia.

Design Approach 
Yabu Pushelberg’s design approach is rooted in storytelling. Using narrative as a tool to connect and articulate context and purpose, the studio process begins by developing fictional characters and a script that are used to guide the project's direction. The narrative becomes a framework to their process which is further defined and distilled through the contributions of the studio’s strategy and positioning, interior, lighting, product, and styling teams who add their layer of thought and expertise to the final experience.

Interior
In 1984 Yabu Pushelberg designed their first major interior design project, Club Monaco, Toronto. By 1998, Yabu Pushelberg won the James Beard Award for Toronto’s Monsoon Restaurant which captured international attention, including Barry Sternlicht of Starwood Capital Group. Soon after, Yabu Pushelberg was selected to simultaneously design two unique hotels with identical budgets: the 500-room W Hotels New York flagship and the 57-room Four Seasons Marunouchi, Tokyo. It was through these two projects that the studio established their presence in the hospitality industry.

Yabu Pushelberg has crafted signature environments for legacy hospitality brands including Aman, EDITION Hotels Honolulu, Miami Beach, London, and Times Square, Four Seasons Kuwait Burj Alshaya, New York Downtown, Toronto, Tokyo; Park Hyatt Bangkok, New York, Shenzhen, Park Lane Hotel, Rosewood Guangzhou, Viceroy Maldives Resort; Ritz Carlton and Las Alcobas, Mexico City. Retail projects include LVMH department store La Samaritaine, goop MRKT Toronto, Bergdorf Goodman,  Barneys New York; Louis Vuitton, Hong Kong;  Lane Crawford Home, Hong Kong; Printemps Paris; and Tiffany & Co. Ltd, Wall Street, New York.

Product
Yabu Pushelberg has designed product collections for international brands including Avenue Road Furniture, B&B Italia, Collection Particulière, Eggersmann, Fantini, Glas Italia, Henge, Lasvit, Ligne Roset, Linteloo, Marset, Man of Parts, Molteni&C, Neinkamper, Pampaloni, Salvatori, Tai Ping, Tribu, Van Rossum, Warp and Weft.

Education

Scholarships 
Yabu Pushelberg Award for Innovation in Interior Design, Ryerson University

As proud Ryerson alumni, George Yabu and Glenn Pushelberg created a permanent scholarship and internship program running 17 years strong. The Yabu Pushelberg Award for Innovation in Interior Design, a scholarship which supports student entrepreneurs in design, bring student ideas to life. The internship program brings these students into the workplace to get hands-on experience and mentorship from our team.

Yabu Pushelberg Endowed Scholarship Fund, The New School

In 2016, Yabu Pushelberg created the Yabu Pushelberg Endowed Scholarship Fund at The New School to endow a permanent, named scholarship for a student in the Interior Design Program at Parsons. This scholarship honors the firm’s ongoing commitment to excellence in design education and its dedication to the promotion of creativity and imagination of young designers.

This scholarship provides critical financial support which will enable one student each year to take on a rigorous academic curriculum and to engage in experiential learning opportunities at Parsons. As a permanent endowment at Parsons, The Yabu Pushelberg Scholarship at Parsons will help many students to advance their art and design education — and move forward in creative careers – for years to come.

Recognition

References 

12. ECHO Aventura - Aventura, Florida (2014)

External links 
 Official website

Interior design firms